Alexander Zverev defeated Andrey Rublev in the final, 6–2, 6–3 to win the men's singles tennis title at the 2021 Cincinnati Masters. It was his fifth Masters 1000 title and 17th career singles title on the ATP Tour.

Novak Djokovic was the reigning champion, but did not participate.

Seeds
The top eight seeds receive a bye into the second round.

Draw

Finals

Top half

Section 1

Section 2

Bottom half

Section 3

Section 4

Qualifying

Seeds

Qualifiers

Lucky loser

Qualifying draw

First qualifier

Second qualifier

Third qualifier

Fourth qualifier

Fifth qualifier

Sixth qualifier

Seventh qualifier

References

External links
Main draw
Qualifying draw

Men's Singles